Farhang-e-rabbani (jadid) is an Urdu-Banglaبنگلااُردُو dictionary. It came to light in 1952. It was certified by Dr. Muhammad Shahidullah and Suniti Kumar Chatterji. It was the first Bangla-Urdu dictionary, when Bangladesh was part of the Dominion of Pakistan as East Bengal. This dictionary was collected or made by Shiraj Rabbani.

References

1952 books
Translation dictionaries
Urdu-language books
Bengali-language books